Zhang Xiaoqiang (born 1952) is the vice-director of the Chinese National Development and Reform Commission.

Biography
Zhang Xiaoqiang began to work in 1969, and graduated from the Economics Department of Peking University in 1982. Now he is Vice Minister and Member of Leading Party Members’ Group, in National Development and Reform Commission.

References

1952 births
Living people
People's Republic of China economists
Peking University alumni
Economists from Hunan
Politicians from Changsha
People's Republic of China politicians from Hunan
Chinese Communist Party politicians from Hunan